Mihály Fekete (1 November 1894 – 15 July 1991) was a Hungarian racewalker. He competed in the men's 10 kilometres walk at the 1924 Summer Olympics.

References

External links
 

1894 births
1991 deaths
Athletes (track and field) at the 1924 Summer Olympics
Hungarian male racewalkers
Olympic athletes of Hungary
Place of birth missing
20th-century Hungarian people